was a pioneering Japanese professional racing cyclist. He was the first Japanese to ride professionally in Europe, riding for such teams as the Belgian team Hitachi and the Swiss team Bleiker in the late 1980s and early 1990s. He was also the first to complete a Grand Tour event, finishing 50th in the in 1990 Giro d'Italia.

Major results
1992
 6th Giro di Toscana
 7th Japan Cup

General classification results timeline

References

External links

1961 births
Living people
Japanese male cyclists
People from Tokyo
Asian Games medalists in cycling
Cyclists at the 1982 Asian Games
Asian Games silver medalists for Japan
Medalists at the 1982 Asian Games